Pinocchio's Christmas is a 1980 Christmas stop motion television special produced by Rankin/Bass Productions that is a holiday adaptation of the 1883 novel The Adventures of Pinocchio by Carlo Collodi. The special was originally aired on ABC on December 3, 1980. It aired annually during the Christmas season on Freeform and as of 2018 airs on AMC.

Synopsis
It is Pinocchio's first Christmas and Geppetto is trying to figure out how to buy a Christmas present for him. So he sells his boots to buy an arithmetic book for Pinocchio who later on sells the book to buy a present for Geppetto. However, he soon runs into the Fox and Cat, whom he thinks are his only friends. The Fox and the Cat convince Pinocchio that he should bury the money he got back for the book in the snow and when the sun sets, they will grow into a Christmas tree covered with gold and silver coins. Pinocchio does exactly that. While he's not there to pay attention, the Fox and the Cat dig the coins out of the ground before he returns.

When Pinocchio returns and finds that the tree didn't grow with the Fox and the Cat claiming that the tree failed to grow, he takes part in Maestro Fire-Eater's Christmas puppet show where he plays Sir Larry Olive-Tree. During the show, he befriends Julietta, one of Fire-Eater's marionettes. After the show, Maestro Fire-Eater tells Pinocchio that he needs to turn Jullietta into one of the Magi for a Christmas pageant next week. But Pinocchio runs off, taking Julietta with him. Maestro Fire-Eater calls a nearby gendarme to chase after him.

Pinocchio manages to escape the gendarmes and brings Julietta with him to the Forest of Enchantment where he was born. Pinocchio explains his backstory to her like how he came to life, how he accidentally drove away a Talking Cricket that Geppetto is friends with, and how he met the Fox and the Cat who taught him how to misbehave and play hooky from school. After finishing his story, Pinocchio fears he may never see his father again. Just then, the Fox and the Cat show up telling Pinocchio they know how he can bring Julietta to life using a secret medicine which he can only find if he goes on a sleigh ride over seven mountains and seven valleys.

Before Pinocchio can embark on that journey though, a blue light appears calling out his name which scares away the Fox and the Cat and causes Pinocchio to faint. It is soon revealed to be Lady Azura who planted the seed that grew into the tree Pinocchio was originally chopped down from. She brings in a doctor whom Pinocchio recognizes as the Talking Cricket. Pinocchio attempts to explain his terrible action of stealing Julietta from Maestro Fire-Eater by lying which causes his nose to grow. Upon seeing what has happened to his nose, Pinocchio tells the truth and it returns to normal. Azura tells Pinocchio that the only gift he really needs to give Geppetto is love. With that, Pinocchio leaves Julietta in Lady Azura's care and Dr. Cricket goes to make sure Pinocchio stays out of trouble.

Pinocchio starts making his way home, but he suddenly again runs into the Fox and the Cat who say that he should go to the North Pole and get a job teaching Santa Claus' toys how to dance. They bring Pinocchio to a sleigh driver they were speaking with earlier who wraps Pinocchio up in a gift box and sells it to a duke who needs a present to give to his children, whom he does not spend much time with. When the kids open up their present, Pinocchio tells the Duke that he should stay home with his kids for Christmas.

Afterward, Santa Claus arrives in his sleigh and brings Pinocchio and Dr. Cricket back to Geppetto's workshop, where Pinocchio is joyously reunited with his father and promises to always be a good boy. Lady Azura then arrives with her servants and a now-sentient Julietta and they all sit down to Christmas breakfast. During the meal, Lady Azura tells Pinocchio that while he may be led astray as Pinocchio sees the Fox and the Cat briefly waving at him in the window. He will also have many other misadventures (such as getting turned into a donkey and getting swallowed by a whale). As long as he stays on the path of being a good boy, he will someday gain the reward of being a real boy.

Cast
 Todd Porter – Pinocchio
 George S. Irving – Mister Geppetto
 Alan King – Maestro Fire-Eater
 Bob McFadden – Talking Cricket, Sleigh Driver
 Allen Swift – The Fox, Santa Claus, Mr. Cherry
 Pat Bright – The Cat
 Diane Leslie – Lady Azura
 Gerry Matthews – Additional voice
 Ray Owens – Additional voice
 Tiffany Blake – Child
 Carl Tramon – Child
 Alice Gayle – Child

Staff
 Producers/Directors – Arthur Rankin, Jr., Jules Bass
 Writer – Romeo Muller
 Music – Maury Laws
 Lyrics – Julian P. Gardner
 Design – Paul Coker, Jr.
 Sound Recording – John Curcio
 Production Coordinator – Lee Dannacher
 Associate Producer – Masaki Iizuka
 Animagic Supervisors – Akikazu Kono, Ichiro Komuro, Hiroshi Tabata, Seiichi Araki, Fuminori Minami, Mituharu Hirata, Shinichi Noro
 Music Arranger/Conductor – Maury Laws

Songs
 "I Never Know What Gifts To Buy" – Geppetto
 "Knock On Wood" – Pinocchio and Chorus
 "Let 'Em Laugh" – Maestro Fire-Eater and Chorus
 "It's The Truth" – The Fox and the Cat
 "Love, The Perfect Gift For Christmas Day" – Lady Azora
 "The Very Best Friend I Ever Had" – Geppetto
 "Dancin'" – Pinocchio and Chorus
 "Wicked Glee" – Sleigh Driver

See also
 The New Adventures of Pinocchio (1960–1961), also produced by Rankin/Bass

References

External links
 Pinocchio's Christmas at The Internet Movie Database

1980 animated films
1980 films
1980 television specials
1980s American animated films
1980s American television specials
American animated television films
Animated Christmas television specials
Animated films based on children's books
1980s animated television specials
Christmas television specials
Films scored by Maury Laws
Television shows directed by Jules Bass
Television shows directed by Arthur Rankin Jr.
Pinocchio films
Santa Claus in film
Santa Claus in television
Stop-motion animated short films
Rankin/Bass Productions television specials
Stop-motion animated television shows
Television shows written by Romeo Muller
American Christmas television specials
1980s children's animated films
Animated Christmas films
Television shows based on The Adventures of Pinocchio